Judge Shaikh Nasib Al Bitar (June 13, 1890–June 26, 1948) was a Palestinian jurist, born in the city of Nablus in Palestine. He was the second son of Sayyed Said Al Bitar Al Husseini.

Education 

He finished his elementary education in Nablus on July 13, 1902. He completed Al Rushdieh by 1905. For his college education he started in Nablus and then went to Al Azhar University in Cairo for his university degree. He then went to Istanbul for his higher education in Islamic Law. He finished as the First World War broke out.

Military career 

As a new graduate he was recruited by the Ottoman Army sent to the Military Cadet School and graduated as an officer. He served gallantly for about four years moving up the ranks, thus got his share of the First World War and a medal for his honorable discharge and gallant service. He had served most of his military duty in Iraq.

Career in the justice system 

After the War he worked all over Palestine in Islamic Law courts, starting in Jaffa in 1921, to Jerusalem in 1923 followed by Gaza as an Islamic Judge in 1938, Nazareth and Jenin came later in 1942 together with Beisan. He then was appointed to Haifa in 1944. Finally back to Jerusalem in 1946 as the Jerusalem Islamic Judge.

Judicial services 

 
Jaffa Islamic Court                           11 September 1921
Jerusalem Islamic Court                      27 February  1923
Gaza Islamic Court                           15 April     1938
Nazareth and Jenin Islamic Courts        1 January   1942
Haifa Islamic Court                           1 January   1944
Jerusalem Islamic Court                       1 January   1946
He died in Amman and was buried in Nablus 26 June      1948

Book 

He wrote a book  about the law of inheritance in Islam, first published on 30 September 1931 under the title Al Fareedah Fi Hisab Al Fareeddah. When he died it was discovered that he was in the process of writing another book on the same topic in Turkish, unfortunately he could not finish the manuscript. In 1986 Al Nahar Daily News Paper wrote about him quoting a paragraph from Ajjaj Nuweihed's book  Men from Palestine.

Community leadership 

Whenever he went to Nablus he was always invited to lead the prayers in the main mosque as a gesture of respect. He also was an expert in Arabic calligraphy and sometimes gave lessons of "Al Khat Alarabi" at Al Rawdah School in Jerusalem next to the court-house. He was a member of al-Muntada al-Adabi . He wrote poetry but never published it, he only exchanged reciting it with his intellectual friends in his Majlis .

Death 

One day during the 1948 War and as a result of it, he felt a severe headache and felt very sick, and because of the war all hospitals in Palestine would not take him in. He had to be taken to the Italian Hospital in Amman, Jordan. There he died on June 26, 1948. He was buried in Nablus his birthplace in Palestine.

Life coincidences 

One astonishing fact was the death of Sheik Nasib and his wife Bahija.

 He died in 1948, She died in 1967, they both died during war-time.
 He died on June 26, 1948; she also died on June 26, 1967. They died two wars apart.
 He died at the Italian Hospital in Amman; she also died at the same hospital.

References

See also

Islamic inheritance jurisprudence

People from Jerusalem
People from Nablus
1890 births
1948 deaths
Palestinian judges
Palestinian Sunni Muslims
Al-Azhar University alumni
Sharia judges
19th-century people from the Ottoman Empire
Burials in Palestine